Christopher Kelly (born 1964) is an Australian classicist and historian, who specializes in the later Roman Empire and the classical tradition. He has been Master of Corpus Christi College, Cambridge since 2018.

Early life and education
He studied history and law at the University of Sydney as an undergraduate. He earned a doctorate at Trinity College, Cambridge. His doctoral thesis was titled "Corruption and bureaucracy in the later Roman Empire", and was submitted in 1993.

Academic career
Kelly is Professor of Classics and Ancient History in the Faculty of Classics, University of Cambridge. He is a previous chairman of the faculty. From 2006 to 2008, he held a Leverhulme Trust Major Research Fellowship. On 12 July 2017, he was elected Master of Corpus Christi College, Cambridge. His term as Master began in Michaelmas 2018. His appointment follows his tenure as senior tutor in the early 2000s, when he was strongly criticised by some members of the student body for his policies, and the college JCR threatened to refuse to acknowledge his plans to assign rooms based on exam results.

Kelly was editor of the Proceedings of the Cambridge Philological Society and Cambridge Classical Journal from 2000 to 2006. He is currently editor of the Journal of Roman Studies and President of the Cambridge Philological Society.

Author
Kelly's first major work was Ruling the Later Roman Empire (2006). In The End of Empire (2009), characterized as a "semi-popular work", he took a revisionist view of Attila the Hun as a "thoughtful and effective political and military leader."

Kelly contributed to The Cambridge Ancient History and to Late Antiquity: A Guide to the Postclassical World, edited by G.W. Bowersock, Peter Brown, and Oleg Grabar. He is an occasional reviewer for publications such as London Review of Books, Literary Review, and History Today.

Selected works
 
 
 
 As editor: 
 As editor:

References

 

 

Historians of ancient Rome
1964 births
Living people
Place of birth missing (living people)
Presidents of the Cambridge Union